Miguel Angel Moyron (born September 6, 1987, in Guadalajara) is a Mexican figure skater. He is the 2002 and 2005 Mexican national champion.

Programs

Competitive highlights

 N = Novice level; QR = Qualifying Round

References

External links
 Tracings.net profile

Mexican male single skaters
1987 births
Living people
Sportspeople from Guadalajara, Jalisco